The following is a list of war crime trials and tribunals brought against the Axis powers following the conclusion of World War II.

 Nazi Germany
Nuremberg Trials of the 24 most important leaders of the Third Reich;  1945–1946, held by the United Kingdom, the United States, the Soviet Union, and France. 
Subsequent Nuremberg Trials
 Dachau Trials; Judge Advocate General's Corps, United States Army tribunal held within the walls of the former Dachau concentration camp, 1945–1948
 Auschwitz Trial; held in Kraków, Poland in 1947 against 40 SS-staff of the Auschwitz concentration camp death factory
 Frankfurt Auschwitz Trials; trial of 22 staff members from Auschwitz, first criminal trial of Holocaust perpetrators under German jurisdiction
 Belzec Trial; before the 1st Munich District Court in the mid-1960s of the eight SS-men of the Belzec extermination camp command
 Majdanek Trials; the overall longest Nazi war crimes trial in history spanning over 30 years
 Sobibor Trial; held in Hagen, Germany in 1965, concerning the Sobibor extermination camp officials
 Chełmno Trials of the Chełmno extermination camp personnel; held in Poland and in Germany. The cases were decided almost twenty years apart
 Supreme National Tribunal for Trial of War Criminals; active in Poland from 1946 to 1948
 Empire of Japan
International Military Tribunal for the Far East (Allied tribunal held in Tokyo for leaders of the Empire of Japan)
 Nanjing War Crimes Tribunal (Tribunal created by the Republic of China for crimes committed in the Chinese theatre)
Shenyang and Taiyuan Special Military Tribunal (created by People's Republic of China for crimes committed in the Chinese theatre)
French Permanent Military Tribunal in Saigon (French military tribunal which investigated war crimes committed in French Indochina after the Japanese coup d'état in French Indochina.)
 Philippine War Crimes Commission (American military tribunal in charge of the war crimes trials of Tomoyuki Yamashita and Masaharu Homma)
 Yokohama War Crimes Trials, tried by the US Military Commission at Yokohama 1945-1949
 Khabarovsk War Crime Trials, tribunal of Kwantung Army officials for use of chemical and biological weapons
 Other
Hungarian People's Tribunals
 Romanian People's Tribunals; held to try war criminals who had served under Ion Antonescu's fascist government in Romania
 Bulgarian People's Tribunals; 
 Yugoslav People's Tribunals
 War-responsibility trials in Finland
 Czechoslovak People's Tribunals

Notes

External links
 Axis History Factbook: War Crimes Trials

Axis war crime trials